Holy Family High School is a private, Roman Catholic high school in Lindsay, Nebraska, United States.  It is located in the Roman Catholic Archdiocese of Omaha.

Description

Preschool and Grades 1-12 Rural Parochial School. Mission:
To Educate the whole person – Spiritually, Morally, Scholastically, Physically and Aesthetically.

References

External links
 School website

Catholic secondary schools in Nebraska
Schools in Platte County, Nebraska
Roman Catholic Archdiocese of Omaha